Wolfiporia curvispora is a species of fungus in the order Polyporales. It is found in Jilin, China, where it grows on the rotting wood of Pinus koraiensis. The fungus was described as new to science in 1998 by mycologist Yu-Cheng Dai. They are creamy white (buff when dry), soft, and light. The hyphal system is dimitic, comprising generative and skeletal hyphae. The specific epithet curvispora refers to the curved spores.

References

Polyporaceae
Fungi described in 1998
Fungi of China
Taxa named by Yu-Cheng Dai